Avdija Vršajević (born 6 March 1986) is a Bosnian professional footballer who plays as a right back for Bosnian Premier League club Sarajevo.

Club career
Vršajević's first professional club was NK TOŠK Tešanj. Here he spent the 2003-04 season before moving to Željezničar. He spent only one season at Željezničar before Čelik Zenica acquired his services. He remained at Čelik for two seasons, often in and out of the first team.

From Čelik, Avdija moved to Czech side AC Sparta Prague but never made an appearance for them, spending loan spells initially at SK Kladno and then at 1. FC Tatran Prešov. Tatran made his loan move permanent in 2009 and he spent the following two seasons there, making 60 appearances and scoring three goals. He was played as either a right back or a right winger at Tatran.

Avdija moved back to Čelik in 2011, spending one season at the club where he made a further 21 appearances.

As he only signed a one-year contract at Čelik and chose not to renew it when the season ended, Avdija moved to Croatian side Hajduk Split, signing a three-year contract. He made his debut for Hajduk on 22 July 2012 in a 0–0 draw against Istra. Immediately becoming the club's first choice right back, Avdija made 30 appearances in all competitions in his first season at Hajduk. In the 2013–14 season, manager Igor Tudor changed his role in the team often. Throughout the season he found himself at left back, right back and right wing, once again making 30 appearances in all competitions.

In June 2015, Vršajević left Hajduk Split, after agreeing mutual termination with the club.

On 18 July 2015, he signed with newly promoted Turkish side Osmanlıspor.

Three years later, Vršajević signed a two-year contract with Akhisarspor. He made his debut in the 2018 Turkish Super Cup against Galatasaray.

International career
In 2006, Vršajević was called to Bosnia and Herzegovina under-21 side by then coach Ibrahim Zukanović.

He made his Bosnia and Herzegovina debut in 2012 in a 8–1 World Cup qualification win away against Liechtenstein under coach Safet Sušić. Vršajević was named in the Bosnia and Herzegovina 23-man squad for their first World Cup participation ever in the 2014 World Cup. On 25 June 2014, he scored his first goal and Bosnia's third in the 83rd minute to make it 3–1 for Bosnia and Herzegovina against Iran in the last group match, where he also made his World Cup debut. He has earned a total of 17 caps, scoring 2 goals. His final international was a March 2017 World Cup qualification match against Gibraltar.

Career statistics

International

International goals
Scores and results list Bosnia and Herzegovina's goal tally first.

Honours
Akhisarspor
Turkish Super Cup: 2018

References

External links

Player profile on sparta.cz 
Player profile on skkladno.cz 

1986 births
Living people
People from Tešanj
Bosniaks of Bosnia and Herzegovina
Association football defenders
Bosnia and Herzegovina footballers
Bosnia and Herzegovina international footballers
2014 FIFA World Cup players
NK TOŠK Tešanj players
FK Željezničar Sarajevo players
NK Čelik Zenica players
AC Sparta Prague players
SK Kladno players
1. FC Tatran Prešov players
HNK Hajduk Split players
Ankaraspor footballers
Akhisarspor footballers
Ümraniyespor footballers
FK Sarajevo players
Premier League of Bosnia and Herzegovina players
Czech First League players
Slovak Super Liga players
Croatian Football League players
Süper Lig players
TFF First League players
Bosnia and Herzegovina expatriate footballers
Expatriate footballers in the Czech Republic
Bosnia and Herzegovina expatriate sportspeople in the Czech Republic
Expatriate footballers in Slovakia
Bosnia and Herzegovina expatriate sportspeople in Slovakia
Expatriate footballers in Croatia
Bosnia and Herzegovina expatriate sportspeople in Croatia
Expatriate footballers in Turkey
Bosnia and Herzegovina expatriate sportspeople in Turkey